This is a list of the toponymy of street names in the London district of Vauxhall. The area has no formally defined boundaries – those utilised here are Black Prince Road to the north, Kennington Road to the north-east, Kennington Park Road/Clapham Road to the south-east, Miles Street/Fentiman Road to the south, and Wandsworth Road/Nine Elms Lane/river Thames to the west.
 
 Albert Embankment – built in the 1860s over former marshlands, it was named for Albert, Prince Consort, husband of Queen Victoria
 Ashmole Street – after Elias Ashmole, noted 17th century antiquarian, who lived near here
 Auckland Street
 Aveline Street
 Bedser Close – presumably for Alec Bedser, widely regarded as one of the best English cricketers of the 20th century, by association with the nearby Oval Cricket Ground
 Black Prince Road – after Edward the Black Prince, son of Edward III, who owned this land
 Bondway – after the late 18th century developers of this street John and Sarah Bond
 Bonnington Square
 Bowling Green Street – this land was formerly a bowling green leased to the owners of the nearby Horns Tavern
 Brangton Road
 Cardigan Street
 Carroun Road – after the former Carroun, or Caron, House which stood here
 Citadel Place
 Clapham Road – as it leads to the south-west London area of this name
 Claylands Place and Claylands Road – after the former brick clay fields located here prior to 1800
 Clayton Street – after the Clayton family, who leased much of this land from the Duchy of Cornwall from the 1660s on
 Coney Way
 Cottingham Road
 Courtenay Square and Courtenay Street
 Dolland Street
 Durham Street 
 Ebbisham Drive 
 Elias Place
 Farnham Royal 
 Fentiman Road – after local mid-19th century developer John Fentiman
 Glasshouse Walk – after the former Vauxhall Glassworks here, which thrived in the 1700s
 Glyn Street
 Goding Street
 Graphite Square
 Hanover Gardens
 Hansom Mews
 Harleyford Road – after local leaseholders the Claytons, whose country house was Harleyford Manor, Buckinghamshire
 Harold Place
 Jonathan Street – for Jonathan Tyers and his son, managers of the nearby Vauxhall Gardens for much of the 18th century
 Kennington Gardens, Kennington Oval, Kennington Park Road, Kennington Road – after the Old English Chenintune (‘settlement of Chenna’a people’); another explanation is that it means "place of the King", or "town of the King". 
 Lambeth Road and South Lambeth Place – refers to a harbour where lambs were either shipped from or to. It is formed from the Old English 'lamb' and 'hythe'.
 Langley Lane
 Laud Street – after William Laud, Archbishop of Canterbury from 1633 to 1645, by association with the nearby Lambeth Palace
 Lawn Lane – after a former row of houses here called The Lawn, after their grass plots, demolished in 1889-90
 Leopold Walk
 Lilac Place
 Loughborough Street
 Magee Street
 Meadow Mews and Meadow Road – after the former meadows here attached to Caron House
 Miles Street
 Montford Place
 Newburn Street
 New Spring Gardens Walk – after the former Vauxhall Gardens here
 Nine Elms Lane – after a row of nine elm trees which formerly stood along this lane
 Orsett Street
 Oval Way – after the adjacent Oval Cricket Ground
 Palfrey Place
 Parry Street – after Thomas Parry, 17th century statesman and owner of Copt Hall, a house near here
 Pegasus Place
 Randall Road and Randall Row
 Riverside Walk – simply a descriptive name
 Rudolf Place
 St Oswald's Place
 Salamanca Place and Salamanca Street 
 Sancroft Street – after William Sancroft, 79th Archbishop of Canterbury, by association with the nearby Lambeth Palace
 Stables Way
 Stanley Close
 Tinworth Street – after George Tinworth, noted ceramic artist for the Royal Doulton ceramics company at Lambeth
 Trigon Road
 Tyers Street and Tyers Terrace – for Jonathan Tyers and his son, managers of the nearby Vauxhall Gardens for much of the 18th century
 Vauxhall Bridge (and Bridgefoot), Vauxhall Grove, Vauxhall Street and Vauxhall Walk – from the name of Falkes de Breauté, the head of King John's mercenaries, who owned a large house in the area, which was referred to as Faulke's Hall, later Foxhall, and eventually Vauxhall; the Bridge opened in 1816
 Wandsworth Road – as it led to the south-west London area of this name
 Wickham Street
 Windmill Row
 Worgan Street
 Wynyard Terrace

References
Citations

Sources

Streets in the London Borough of Lambeth
Lists of United Kingdom placename etymology
History of the London Borough of Lambeth
Vauxhall
Vauxhall
England geography-related lists